The Parramatta Light Rail (often unofficially referred to as the Western Sydney Light Rail) is a project for a  light rail line in Sydney, New South Wales, Australia, which is under construction and due to start passenger services in May 2024. The line will run from Westmead to Carlingford via the Western Sydney centre of Parramatta. The initial announcement of the project also included an eastern branch from Camellia to Strathfield. Plans to construct this branch were deferred in February 2017, and in October the original plans were replaced with a redesigned and truncated route to Sydney Olympic Park. The project will add to light rail in Sydney but the new line will be completely separated from the existing lines. It is being managed by Transport for NSW.

Design 
The routes will begin at Westmead before proceeding east to Camellia or Rydalmere via North Parramatta and the Parramatta CBD. At Camellia/Rydalmere the two routes split. The stage 1 route goes north to Carlingford, while the stage 2 route continues east to Sydney Olympic Park.

Stage 1 (main route through Parramatta and branch to Carlingford) 
The stage 1 route was announced on 17 February 2017. The stage 1 route runs between Westmead and Carlingford via North Parramatta, the Parramatta CBD, Camellia, Rydalmere, Dundas and Telopea. It includes sixteen stops along a  route. It includes two wire-free sections—one between Westmead and Cumberland Hospital—and another between Prince Alfred Square and Tramway Avenue. The maintenance and stabling facility will be located east of Rosehill Racecourse. Trams will access the facility via a short branch line that uses the alignment of the Sandown railway line.

The Environmental Impact Statement for stage 1 was released in August 2017. Planning approval was granted in May 2018.

The stops are:

[
{
  "type": "ExternalData",
  "service": "page",
  "title": "Parramatta Light Rail.map"
},
{
  "type": "ExternalData",
  "service": "page",
  "title": "Parramatta Light Rail stops.map"
}
]

Stage 2 (branch to Sydney Olympic Park) 
[
{
  "type": "ExternalData",
  "service": "page",
  "title": "Parramatta Light Rail stage 2 original indicative route.map"
},
{
  "type": "ExternalData",
  "service": "page",
  "title": "Parramatta Light Rail stage 2.map"
}
]
The second branch of the light rail continues east to Sydney Olympic Park.

There are two options being considered for the connection to the stage 1 route. The first option would utilise the Carlingford railway line (and stage 1) corridor over the Parramatta River to Rydalmere, where it would then branch. The second option would leave the main stage 1 route at Camellia and utilise the branch line built to provide access to the tram depot. It would continue via the Sandown railway line corridor and Grand Avenue, then cross the Parramatta River just east of Rydalmere ferry wharf. Both versions of the route then continue via Ermington and Melrose Park, cross back to the south of the Parramatta River, pass through Wentworth Point and terminate at Sydney Olympic Park. The stage 2 route is around nine kilometres (six miles) long and will include ten to twelve stops. The second option is shown as the planned route on the Parramatta Light Rail website.

The original plans for this branch followed a route similar to that taken by Grand Avenue through Camellia before crossing the Duck River, passing through Newington, crossing Haslams Creek, serving Sydney Olympic Park and terminating at the major transport hub of Strathfield.

Construction 

[
{
  "type": "ExternalData",
  "service": "page",
  "title": "Carlingford line conversion to light rail - shaded.map"
},
{
  "type": "ExternalData",
  "service": "page",
  "title":"Sandown railway line.map"
},
{
  "type": "ExternalData",
  "service": "page",
  "title": "T6 Carlingford Line.map"
}
]
In November 2017, a CPB Contractors/Downer Group joint venture and John Holland were shortlisted to build stage 1. At the same time, three consortia were shortlisted to supply the rolling stock, maintain the infrastructure and operate the services:
Connecting Parramatta: John Holland, Alstom and Deutsche Bahn
Greater Parramatta: Downer Rail, Keolis Downer, Downer Group, Ansaldo and CRRC Changchun Railway Vehicles
Great River City Light Rail: Transdev Australasia, CAF and Laing O'Rourke

The winning bidders were announced in December 2018. The CPB/Downer joint venture will build the majority of the infrastructure, while Great River City Light Rail will build the depot, light rail stops and power systems, supply the vehicles and operate the network. The total budget for stage 1 is 2.4 billion.

Construction began in 2018, with the line expected to open in 2024.

In July 2018, work commenced on site remediation at the Camelia depot site. Major construction was originally planned to start in June 2020. This was brought forward to January 2020 and the first sod was turned on 31 January 2020.

Micro tunnelling will be used to build drainage and stormwater capacity underneath Church Street, to minimise construction impacts and disruptions in comparison to traditional pipeline construction such as excavating above the ground. The first micro-tunnel machine was launched in June 2020 from Centenary Square to Parramatta Town Hall and will connect to an existing pipe to extend stormwater capacity. A second micro-tunnel machine will also be launched from Centenary Square to Lennox Bridge to build drainage and stormwater capacity underneath Church Street.

Major construction of Stage 1 commenced at Westmead in July 2020.

Traffic changes 
Traffic changes were implemented along and surrounding the light rail alignment as part of enabling works.

Church Street 
Church Street between Macquarie Street and Market Street became a pedestrian-only zone on 1 February 2020 prior to the start of major construction in June that year. This included "Eat Street", a section of Church Street between George Street and Lennox Bridge where restaurants and outdoor tables and seating are located. The NSW government previously stated that work on 'Eat Street' would not start until 2020. During construction, outdoor dining infrastructure along "Eat Street" would be removed and construction hoarding would be erected. The initial plan was, between 1 November to 31 January each year, 'Eat Street' would benefit from a construction 'grace period', when construction hoardings would be removed and outdoor tables and seating would be temporarily reintroduced. This was to ensure that business owners, diners, tourists and shoppers do not experience constant construction works during the busy holiday season. However, after consulting with the Parramatta Light Rail Business Reference Group and Eat Street businesses, the plan was changed to 'fast tracking' the works during the initial grace period and delaying the grace period. This would allow major construction to be completed earlier (scheduled on August 2021), followed by a delayed grace period, before installation of stops, testing and commissioning begins. The "Eat Street" reopened to outdoor dining in October 2021 following the lifting of COVID-19 lockdown restrictions.

Church Street between Barney Street and Victoria Road was closed to traffic on 3 July 2020. Bus services along Church Street were redirected to travel along O'Connell Street.

George Street 
On 29 November 2019, George Street between O'Connell Street and Harris/Macarthur Street was converted from the existing one-way eastbound configuration into two-way traffic. The parking and the travel lanes along the southern side of George Street were temporarily removed one week prior, to allow eastbound motorists to get used to travelling on the northern side of George Street. The conversion of George Street to two-way traffic is to offset the loss of westbound lanes on Macquarie Street, which is along the light rail alignment.

O'Connell Street 
In June 2020, works to widen O'Connell Street to four lanes between Barney Street and Albert Street were completed. The intersection of O'Connell Street and Barney Street was also reconstructed to allow continuous flow between both roads.

Bus Service changes 
After Church Street closed on 1 February 2020, the Parramatta free shuttle service 900 ran on a modified route, running along George Street instead of Macquarie Street.

Railway line closures 

The northern branch to Carlingford will reuse most of the Carlingford railway line, which closed on 5 January 2020. The closure included Rosehill railway station, located between Clyde and Camellia, which will not be served by the light rail project. The level crossing across Parramatta Road was also removed later that month.

The Carlingford line was single track for most of its length, had shorter platforms than other lines in Sydney and had long been seen as under-utilised. Patronage declined from 446,000 journeys in 2001 to 260,000 journeys in 2014. 2016-17 patronage figures based on Opal card tap on and off data recorded 511,000 journeys on the line during the year. This placed the line last among all train lines in the Opal network. Various modification schemes to revitalise the line had been proposed. Action for Transport 2010, a New South Wales Government plan released in 1998, included the Parramatta Rail Link; a heavy rail line from Parramatta to Chatswood that would have utilised the Carlingford line between Camellia and Carlingford. As part of the CityRail Clearways Project announced in 2004, a passing loop was to have been built at Rydalmere, enabling a more frequent service. Neither scheme came to fruition.

The Sandown railway line was officially closed in June 2019 and removal of the line and tracks began in July 2019. This 1.5 kilometre line diverged from the Carlingford line at Camellia and ran close to the southern bank of the Parramatta River. Passenger services had ceased in December 1991, though the line's Rosehill platform remained in use for special charters, while freight trains ceased in June 2010 when trains from the Clyde Refinery last ran. The western end of the Sandown line will be used by the light rail to provide access to a tram stabling and maintenance facility.

Operation 

Transdev will operate the network for eight years, with a possible extension of up to an additional ten years.

A document produced by Transport for NSW in February 2017 stated services would operate every 7.5 minutes throughout the day. However, a press release from December 2018 said services would operate every 7.5 minutes during peak periods, with frequencies at other times left unspecified.

Fleet 
Stage 1 will be operated by a fleet of thirteen Urbos 3 vehicles built by Construcciones y Auxiliar de Ferrocarriles (CAF). Urbos 3 vehicles are also already in operation on the Dulwich Hill Line (Inner West Light Rail).

History

Parramatta - Duck River tramway 
Between 1883 and 1943, a tramway, operated by Sydney Ferries Limited, travelled from the Parramatta Park end of George Street to the mouth of the Duck River, where it originally connected with the company's Parramatta River ferry services to Sydney. The connecting ferries ceased in 1928; the line then primarily carried freight until it closed in March 1943. The Parramatta Light Rail will run via a similar route including via Tramway Avenue in Parramatta - named after the original line.

Route investigation 
In 2013, Parramatta City Council published a $1 million feasibility study into a proposed Western Sydney Light Rail Network, designed to improve transport links throughout Western Sydney and meet the challenges posed by the projected rise in population in the region in the coming decades. The study found that a light rail system was a viable solution to address the growing transport needs of Parramatta and Western Sydney. The report estimated $20 million in funding was required to undertake a detailed investigation and to prepare a business case. It proposed that construction of the network would take place in several stages, the first of which comprised a route from Macquarie Centre to Castle Hill via Eastwood, Dundas, Parramatta and Baulkham Hills, with a branch from Parramatta to Westmead. Further extensions were proposed from Parramatta to Bankstown and Rhodes.

As part of its 2014/15 budget, the New South Wales Government announced Transport for NSW would investigate ten potential light rail routes in Western Sydney. The government allocated $400 million to ensure funds for detailed planning and construction of an initial project would be 'ready to go', should the investigations prove favourable. Six of the ten routes being investigated were eliminated from contention in October 2014. The routes investigated were:

Of the final four routes, the Macquarie Park via Carlingford and the Strathfield via Olympic Park options were perceived as the frontrunners to be selected. The Macquarie Park route was supported by Parramatta, Ryde and The Hills councils. The Strathfield route was supported by The WestLine Partnership, a lobby group consisting of businesses and organisations with a presence in the area. Auburn and Canada Bay councils were later joined by Strathfield Council as members of the group.

The Strathfield route passes through industrial areas of Sydney and the potential for these areas to generate funding and patronage was a key point of contention during the lobbying period. The WestLine Partnership suggested the Strathfield route could be partially financed via value capture. Property developers building urban renewal projects along the line would provide a financial contribution to the government. The group also suggested building a branch from Newington to Rhodes and indicated its funding model could allow a route to Carlingford to be built as well. Supporters of the Macquarie Park route argued the needs of that corridor were more pressing and the Strathfield route would be poorly utilised in its early years.

Official announcement 

The Parramatta Light Rail scheme was officially unveiled on 8 December 2015, when the government announced it had selected the Strathfield route plus a truncated version of the Macquarie Park route that ends at Carlingford. The two routes were proposed to converge at Camellia and proceed through Parramatta to Westmead.

The government's announcement included a $1 billion contribution towards the project. The government will also adopt the value capture approach advocated by The WestLine Partnership, by instigating an infrastructure contribution on new residential developments along the route. The revenue raised by the levy will be used to help fund the light rail and other infrastructure for the area. The government's investigations into the value capture process held up the announcement of the preferred route but would reportedly have allowed the two lines to be built together. The state government will also explore funding contributions from the federal and local tiers of government. The convenor of The partnership stated that the light rail project's funding model would be used as a test case for funding future infrastructure projects.

Construction of the lines was expected to commence in late 2018 but there was no announcement of an expected completion date or a total budget for the project. An early estimate from January 2016 put the total cost at $3.51 billion.

Deferral and redesign of the eastern branch 
In August 2016, Transport for NSW noted the project could be delivered in stages. A new metro line between the Sydney central business district and Parramatta was announced in November 2016. The metro would adopt a similar route to the Strathfield branch of the light rail; media reports indicated the metro project would most likely cause the deferral of construction of this branch. This was confirmed in February 2017, when it was announced that the Westmead - Camellia section and the Carlingford branch would be built as stage 1 of the light rail project.

Despite the deferral of construction, planning work for the Strathfield via Sydney Olympic Park branch continued. Media reports indicated the route could shift from running to the south of the Parramatta River to the north of the river and that the section from Sydney Olympic Park to Strathfield could be dropped.

The preferred stage 2 route was announced in October 2017. The changes reported on by the media were confirmed. The redesigned route runs from either Rydalmere or Camellia to Sydney Olympic Park via Ermington, Melrose Park and Wentworth Point. No details about the project's cost or construction dates were announced. As at October 2019 the final business case for stage 2 is still being considered.

In November 2020, it was reported that the block of land at Camellia, bought by the NSW government for $53.5 million for the stabling and maintenance depot, was effectively worthless because of high levels of soil contamination. The purchase was referred to the Independent Commission Against Corruption (ICAC) because an internal investigation by the NSW transport department found the purchase of the land, for three times what the Valuer-General estimated it was worth, broke basic rules, and the land was bought from a developer without a valuation. The developer had bought the six-hectare parcel of land only months before, for $38 million.

References

External links 
 Parramatta Light Rail project website

Light rail in Sydney
Proposed railway lines in Australia

Transdev
Tram and light rail transit systems under construction
Transport infrastructure in Parramatta
Camellia, New South Wales